Kombat (the place of the giraffe) is a mine and its associated settlement at the southern margin of the Otavi Mountain Range in northern Namibia. It is situated  East of Otavi on the B8 to Grootfontein. Kombat at its peak had over 1,000 inhabitants.  it is almost abandoned, although Kombat Primary School still operates at reduced capacity, and a clinic is serving the remaining inhabitants.

In the vicinity, Welwitchia Health Training Center brought life to the known ghost town of Kombat. It offers Bachelors of Nursing Science program, Enrolled Nursing Science and Midwifery as well as Bachelor of Information and Communication Technology.

There are also recreational facilities such as Kombat Lodge where visitors and people of the town can enjoy themselves.

Kombat mine

Minerals were discovered near Kombat in 1850. Around the year 1900, Kombat Mine was opened to extract copper. It  was operated by Tsumeb Corporation Limited until the 1970s and by Ongopolo Mining as from 1999. In 2006 Ongopolo and the mine were taken over by Weatherly International PLC, a mining house based in London. Soon thereafter in 2007 the mine flooded, was abandoned, and was dormant for several years. In 2015 Namibian businessman Knowledge Katti acquired the town and the mine for 50 million N$, allegedly with the intention of re-selling it to the Namibian government at a handsome profit.

In November 2021, the Canada-based Trigon metals, Inc announced it had secured $5 million in financing from IXM to reopen the Kombat mine, agreeing to sell concentrate from the mine to IXM for distribution. Mining resumed the next month.

Besides copper, there are sizeable deposits of lead and silver. The mine is known for a host of rare minerals, including glaucochroite.

References 

Populated places in the Otjozondjupa Region
Copper mines in Namibia
Populated places established in 1900
1900 establishments in German South West Africa
Mining communities in Africa